The National Flute Association (NFA) is the largest flute organization in the world, with roughly 5,000 members from more than 50 countries. It is an association in the United States with headquarters in Chicago, Illinois. Members include soloists, orchestral players, jazz and world music performers, teachers, adult amateurs, and students of all ages.

The organization was founded in 1972 by flutist Mark Thomas and incorporated in 1973 in the state of Indiana. In 1973, an ad-hoc committee was created to help plan a convention of flutists. The group became the members of the first Board of Directors. Past presidents, program chairs, and committee chairs have included principal flutists of American orchestras, soloists and chamber musicians, and professors at conservatories and universities. Notable members include Sir James Galway and Ian Anderson. Rebecca Johnson is President of the Board for 2022-2024, and Jennifer Grim is Vice-President.

The first administrative role was established in 1977 and the organization currently has four full-time staff members. Jennifer Clarke was named the Executive Director in January 2021.

Annual Conventions 
The NFA Convention is the largest annual flute event in the world, with more than 3,000 attendees and 80 exhibitors each year. The four-day event includes hundreds of workshops, masterclasses, competitions, and performances. Conventions are held in cities across the United States. Previous locations include San Diego, Washington D.C., New York City, and Chicago. Virtual conventions have replaced in-person gatherings for 2020 and 2021 because of Covid-19 concerns. The 2022 Fiftieth Anniversary Convention was held in Chicago, August 11-14, 2022. The 2023 Convention will be in Phoenix, Arizona, August 3-6, 2023.

Committees 
NFA members have established committees that focus on individual components of the organization and the concerns of the wider flute community, including highlighting less prominent areas of flute musicianship, such as low and Baroque flute, reaching out to underserved communities, and providing pedagogical guidance, among other initiatives. These committees helped establish the NFA’s music commission program, create scholarships and competitions, and collect pedagogical materials aimed at young flutists.

Competitions 
NFA competitions create opportunities for young and emerging flutists to compete and gain performance and audition skills. The Annual NFA Convention currently hosts 15 performance competitions in solo, flute choir, and masterclass categories and four non-performance competitions, which highlight new flute music, research, and entrepreneurship.

Commissions 
The NFA commissions original compositions for all members of the flute family. The New Music Advisory Committee, established in 1985, works with the NFA Board to create opportunities for flutists to interact with contemporary composers by playing their music and ensuring today's composers create substantial repertoire for flute players.

The NFA has commissioned more than 70 new works for both flute and piccolo. Beginning in 1986, the NFA has commissioned a new piece to be used as repertoire in the Young Artist Competition each year. In 1989 a yearly commission for a new work for the High School Soloist Competition was added. The NFA also commissions a piece for the bi-annual Piccolo Artist Competition, as well as special project commissions. Composers include winners of the Pulitzer Prize, Prix de Rome, and other awards.

Scholarships 
The NFA has established numerous scholarship programs for continuing education, including cultural outreach scholarships in 15 U.S. and non-U.S. cities. The NFA supports promising students with several scholarships named after flutists whose involvement in the organization helped shape its vision:

The annual Frances Blaisdell Scholarship, named for Frances Blaisdell, provides a U.S. high school or undergraduate student with the opportunity to receive complimentary registration for that year’s convention and take advantage of the many performances, workshops, and sessions being offered.

Every other year, the NFA offers the Myrna Brown Scholarship, which allows an international student to attend and present at the Annual Convention.

The NFA also offers several scholarship prizes at the convention. The Geoffrey Gilbert Scholarship prize is awarded to the NFA High School Soloist Competition first-place winner for further flute study with any teacher who is a member of the NFA. The Deveau Scholarship is awarded for the outstanding performance of the NFA High School Soloist Competition commissioned work.

Awards 
Since 1991 the National Flute Association has honored the best and the brightest of its colleagues with the Lifetime Achievement Award. The debut award went to Jean-Pierre Rampal. Other notable recipients include Julius Baker and Sir James Galway. The NFA also gives out the Distinguished Service Award, first given to John Solum in 1998.

The NFA Library 
The NFA Library was established in 1973 when exhibiting publishers at the first convention were asked to donate copies of their music. The NFA holds the largest lending library of flute music internationally with a catalog of more than 15,000 works, many of which are rare or out of print. The library is located at the University of Arizona Fine Arts Library in Tucson, Arizona.

Publications 
NFA members create ongoing publications to communicate with the flute world and share valuable research, history, educational, and pedagogical resources.

The NFA’s member magazine, The Flutist Quarterly, is published each season and includes contributions from members, flute scholars, and other enthusiasts from around the world. The NFA also produces special publications, including The Flutist’s Handbook, Kindcaidiana, and historic recordings.

References

External links

 National Flute Association

International music organizations
Non-profit organizations based in California
Flute organizations